Ana Terter (Bulgarian and ; died after 1304) was a Bulgarian princess and Queen consort of Serbia (1284–1299). She was the fourth wife of King Stefan Uroš II Milutin of Serbia.

Her marriage to Stefan Milutin is dynastic, ie foreseen by the Deževa Agreement.

According to George Pachymeres, Ana was "the daughter of Terter, borne to him by the sister of Asen. The sister of Asen was Kira Maria- second wife of George I Terter. According another theory she was the daughter of George Terter and his first wife Maria, making Ana a full sister of Bulgarian tsar Theodore Svetoslav.

In 1284 Ana married King Stefan Uroš II Milutin of Serbia as his third wife. They had two children:
Stefan Uroš III Dečanski, who succeeded as king of Serbia
Anna Neda of Serbia, who married Michael Shishman of Bulgaria.

In 1299 Stefan Uroš II Milutin divorced Ana in order to marry Simonida, who was only 5 years old.

Sources
Krastev, Krasimir. "Съдбата на българската царкиня Анна Тертер" - Тангра. Сборник в чест на 70-годишнината на акад. Васил Гюзелев. С.: СУ, 2006, 649-657
Pavlov, Plamen."Търновските царици". В.Т.:ДАР-РХ, 2006.

References

13th-century births
14th-century deaths
13th-century Serbian royalty
14th-century Serbian people
14th-century Serbian royalty
Serbian queens consort
Bulgarian princesses
13th-century Bulgarian people
13th-century Bulgarian women
14th-century Bulgarian women
14th-century Bulgarian people
14th-century Serbian women
Medieval Serbian royal consorts
Nemanjić dynasty
Ana
Daughters of emperors